Figgjo is a borough of the city of Sandnes in the west part of the large municipality of Sandnes in Rogaland county, Norway.  The borough is located in the southern part of the city.  It has a population (2016) of 2,213.  The borough is mostly rural, but the village of Figgjo lies in the southern edge of the municipality.  About 90% of the population of the borough lives in the village of Figgjo.

Although it is part of the city of Sandnes, Statistics Norway considers Figgjo to be a separate urban area (this urban area is not the same as the borough, just one part of it).  In recent years, however, Figgjo has grown together with the large village of Ålgård, located immediately to the south in the neighboring municipality of Gjesdal. In 2016, Statistics Norway recorded the Ålgård-Figgjo urban area as having a combined population of 10,956. Figgjo's urban area alone has a population of 2,018.

Figgjo is known for the Figgjo factories. Previously the village had a train station on the now closed Ålgård Line.

References

Boroughs and neighbourhoods of Sandnes